Massachusetts House of Representatives' 1st Worcester district in the United States is one of 160 legislative districts included in the lower house of the Massachusetts General Court. It covers part of Worcester County. Republican Kimberly Ferguson of Holden has represented the district since 2011. She is running unopposed for re-election in the 2020 Massachusetts general election.

Towns represented
The district includes the following localities:
 Holden
 Paxton
 Princeton
 Rutland
 Sterling
 Westminster

The current district geographic boundary overlaps with those of the Massachusetts Senate's 1st Worcester district, Worcester and Middlesex district, and Worcester, Hampden, Hampshire and Middlesex district.

Former locales
The district previously covered:
 Ashburnham, circa 1872 
 Winchendon, circa 1872

Representatives
 Jacob B. Harris, circa 1858 
 J. D. Crosby, circa 1859 
 Sidney P. Smith, circa 1888 
 James Oliver, circa 1908
 William Lord, circa 1918
 Almond Smith, circa 1920 
 Charles Cooke, circa 1935
 Samuel Joseph Boudreau, circa 1951 
 H. Thomas Colo, circa 1975 
 Mary Jane McKenna, circa 1983
 Harold Lane, circa 1995
 Lewis G. Evangelidis 
 Kimberly N. Ferguson, 2011-current

See also
 List of Massachusetts House of Representatives elections
 Other Worcester County districts of the Massachusetts House of Representatives: 2nd, 3rd, 4th, 5th, 6th, 7th, 8th, 9th, 10th, 11th, 12th, 13th, 14th, 15th, 16th, 17th, 18th
 Worcester County districts of the Massachusett Senate: 1st, 2nd; Hampshire, Franklin and Worcester; Middlesex and Worcester; Worcester, Hampden, Hampshire and Middlesex; Worcester and Middlesex; Worcester and Norfolk
 List of Massachusetts General Courts
 List of former districts of the Massachusetts House of Representatives

Images
Portraits of legislators

References

External links

 Ballotpedia
  (State House district information based on U.S. Census Bureau's American Community Survey).

House
Government in Worcester County, Massachusetts